Fingerprints is a graphic novel written in conjunction with the film Southland Tales. It is Part Two of the Southland Tales saga. The novel was written by Richard Kelly  - who also directed the film and illustrated by Brett Weldele. The graphic novel was published by Graphitti Designs.

Southland Tales was initially planned to be a nine-part "interactive experience", with the first six parts published in six 100-page graphic novels that would be released in a six-month period up to the film's release in 2007. The feature film comprises the final three parts of the experience. A website was also developed to intertwine with the graphic novels and the film itself. The idea of six graphic novels was later narrowed down to three. The novels were written by Kelly and illustrated by Brett Weldele.

Plot 

June 30, 2008: Ronald Taverner is still on the houseboat with his father and cousin and his girlfriend Sarah Fieldman. We learn that he is suffering from amnesia. His father, Tab, brings him below deck to show him something. Down there is his twin brother-Roland Taverner, he is tied up to a chair. Tab tells him that Ronald kidnapped his own brother to hide him up at the lake for several days. His father tells him that he doesn’t remember it because he hit his head, which caused memory loss and he instructs him to keep taking the injections. His brother Roland was drafted in the Iraq War and was sent home to work for the U.P.U. (Urban Pacification Unit) Level 2 and uncovered a conspiracy and if the government found him, they would get the information out of him.

They need Ronald to impersonate Roland for several days as a part of a mission to destroy US-IDent. He is to meet with a woman named Zora Carmichaels (Cheri Oteri), a Neo-Marxist (a member of the revolution against US-IDent) in Venice Beach. Zora takes Ronald and the tied-up Roland to Los Angeles.

July 1, 2008: Boxer Santaros and Krysta Now finally arrive in Los Angeles. They and Fortunio Balducci (now a producer due to the contract signed in Buffalo Bill’s) visit a friend of Krysta’s named Tawna McBride for research on the script. She tells Boxer to remain in character the entire time.

Inside, Tawna tells Krysta that her husband, Rick, died recently due to a drug overdose, with the same syringe that Boxer had. Boxer shows her the syringe he has and Tawna asks where he got it from and asks whether or not he volunteered for the program. Rick was in the army and volunteered for a Top-Secret program and that the weeks leading up to his death, Rick began to act crazy, wandering off into the desert in the middle of the night saying that he was going to see the Chief. This makes Boxer feel unpleasant so he goes to use the bathroom.

Inside the bathroom, a character in the mirror begins talking to Boxer. He keeps asking Boxer: ‘Do You Bleed?...Not Like we Do, Future-Man’. Boxer asks who the Indian is. The man says that the Indian is a natural bleeder and that it took long to make contact, he took a shot of Fluid Karma (the name of the substance inside the syringes). The Indian is a natural bleeder (he sees forward in time) and the man in the mirror and Boxer are Chemical Bleeders (they see back in time) but when Chemical Bleeders take Fluid Karma too much, they begin to see both ways...this is why the man in the mirror is seeing into the future at Boxer. He is 6 months behind in January 2008.

The man asks is he fucking Tawna and asks where he is. He then begins to recognize Boxer and his films. The man in the mirror is Rick-Tawna’s husband. Boxer tells him that he is dead. Rick doesn’t believe him and he takes a shot of Fluid Karma and he then falls to the ground and dies. Boxer comes rushing out telling Tawna that he saw her husband die and that he was a part of it. She becomes very upset and she kicks them out of her house. Boxer then faints and falls onto the ground...

Boxer seems to be dreaming, he is in a big maze. All of a sudden, a giant snake appears from behind him and it begins to chase Boxer around the maze. Boxer runs up a set of stairs and into a portal. He lands on the other side and sees Ronald standing there. Ronald asks Boxer who he is...Boxer calls himself ‘Jericho Cane’.

All of a sudden, Ronald wakes up from his dream. He is still with Zora in her van driving into Los Angeles. He begins to describe the dream for her.

In the Treer Plaza, Inga von Westphalen and two fellow scientists are discussing an experiment that they are conducting (several people involved in it are the Taverner twins and Boxer). Boxer was apparently guided to Krysta for a reason (which we don’t know yet). Krysta was a part of the experiment also because of her psychic abilities. They believe that her script ‘The Power’ is a ‘guide map for the experiment’ and a work of prophecy. They administered Fluid Karma into Krysta’s system, hypnotized her, and also had her read the entire Book of Revelation, then they told her to create a document that would detail the final three days on Earth before the apocalypse.

Inga gets a telephone call from Zora, who tells her that Ronald has experienced his first ‘Fluid Karma dream’.

Krysta takes Boxer and Fortunio to a barnyard outside of Los Angeles, where many Neo-Marxists are attending a huge party. They meet up with Jimmy Hermosa who leads them into his tattoo parlor. Krysta tells Boxer that this is where he will become Jericho Cane. He is getting numerous tattoos all over his body. At the same time, Ronald and Zora arrive at the barn and she introduces Ronald to Dream and Dion (The leaders of the Neo-Marxist movement). Moments later, Boxer Santaros is introduced to the crowd, who cheer wildly. Ronald is shocked...it’s Jericho Cane from his dream.

External links
Publisher page

2006 graphic novels
Comics based on films